The 2023 Cheltenham Gold Cup (known as the Boodles Cheltenham Gold Cup for sponsorship reasons) was the 95th annual running of the Cheltenham Gold Cup horse race and was held at Cheltenham Racecourse, Gloucestershire, England, on 17 March 2023.

The race was won by the 7-5 favourite Galopin Des Champs, owned by Mrs Audrey Turley, trained in Ireland by Willie Mullins and ridden by Paul Townend. Mullins and Townend were both winning the Cheltenham Gold Cup for a third time in five years, after the victories of Al Boum Photo in 2019 and 2020. Bravemansgame finished second and Conflated was third.

Result
Source -

References

External links

Cheltenham Gold Cup
 2023
Cheltenham Gold Cup
2020s in Gloucestershire
Cheltenham Gold Cup